is a Japanese professional shogi player ranked 7-dan.

Early life
Hiroaki Yokoyama was born on October 16, 1980, in Tama, Tokyo. He was accepted into the Japan Shogi Association's apprentice school at the rank of 6-kyū as a student of shogi professional  in August 1993, was promoted to 1-dan in July 1999, and finally obtained full professional status and corresponding rank of 4-dan in October 2002.

Shogi professional

Promotion history
The promotion history for Yokoyama is as follows:
 6-kyū: 1993
 1-dan: 1999
 4-dan: October 1, 2002
 5-dan: October 30, 2007
 6-dan: December 7, 2012
 7-dan: September 11, 2019

Awards and honors
Yokoyama received the Japan Shogi Association's 42nd Annual Shogi Award for "Most Consecutive Victories" for April 2014March 2015.

Personal life
Yokoyama is a graduate of Chuo University. He has been married to LPSA professional Saori Shimai since July 2011.

References

External links
ShogiHub: Professional Player Info · Yokoyama, Hiroaki

1980 births
Japanese shogi players
Living people
Professional shogi players
Chuo University alumni
Professional shogi players from Tokyo Metropolis
People from Tama, Tokyo